Europium phosphide is an inorganic compound of europium and phosphorus with the chemical formula EuP. Other phosphides are also known.

Preparation
Heating powdered europium and red phosphorus in an inert atmosphere or vacuum:
 4 Eu + P4 → 4 EuP

Passing phosphine through a solution of europium in liquid ammonia:
 Eu + 2PH3 → Eu(PH2)2 + H2
Eu(PH2)2 is formed, which then decomposes to europium(III) phosphide and phosphine:

 2Eu(PH2)2 → 2EuP + 2PH3 + H2

Properties
Europium(III) phosphide forms dark crystals which are stable in air and do not dissolve in water. Like sodium chloride, it crystallizes cubically in the space group Fm3m with cell parameter a = 575.5 nm with four formula units per unit cell. Europium(III) phosphide tends to form europium(II) oxide (EuO) in air, and pure EuP shows Van Vleck paramagnetism. The vapor pressure of EuP is 133-266.6 Pa at 1273 K.

Europium(III) phosphide actively reacts with nitric acid.

Uses
The compound is a semiconductor used in high power, high frequency applications and in laser diodes.

References

Phosphides
Europium(III) compounds
Semiconductor materials
Rock salt crystal structure